Miguel Ángel Marriaga (born 31 October 1986) is a Colombian professional boxer who became the WBC Continental Americas champion in his twelfth match.

Marriaga challenged for major world titles on three occasions. In June 2015 he dropped a unanimous 12-round decision against Nicholas Walters for the WBA (Super) featherweight title. In April 2017 he suffered the defeat by UD against Óscar Valdez for the WBO featherweight belt. In August 2017 he challenged for the WBO junior lightweight belt against Vasiliy Lomachenko but lost via a seventh-round retirement. Between his first and second title attempts, he won the vacant NABO featherweight title.

Professional boxing record

References

External links
 Professional boxing record at Boxrec

1986 births
Living people
Colombian male boxers
Featherweight boxers
People from Bolívar Department
21st-century Colombian people